Dafydd is a Welsh masculine given name, related to David, and more rarely a surname. People so named include:

Given name

Medieval era
Ordered chronologically
 Dafydd ab Owain Gwynedd (c. 1145-1203), Prince of Gwynedd
 Dafydd ap Gruffydd (1238–1283), Prince of Wales
 Dafydd Goch, said to be the illegitimate son of Dafydd ap Gruffydd
 Dafydd ap Gwilym (c. 1315/1320–c. 1350/1370), Welsh poet
 Dafydd ap Llywelyn (1215–1246), Prince of Gwynedd and first Prince of Wales
 Dafydd ap Dafydd ap Llywelyn (born between 1240 and 1246-?), illegitimate son of Dafydd ap Llywelyn
 Dafydd Bach ap Madog Wladaidd (fl. 1340-1390), Welsh poet
 Dafydd Benfras (fl. 1230-1260), Welsh court poet
 Dafydd Ddu o Hiraddug (died 1371), Welsh poet, grammarian and cleric
 Dafydd Gam (1380-1415), Welsh soldier and nobleman who died at the Battle of Agincourt
 Dafydd ab Ieuan or David Holbache (died 1422/3), Welsh politician
 Dafydd Gorlech (c. 1410-c. 1490), Welsh poet
 Dafydd Llwyd ap Llywelyn ap Gruffudd (Dafydd Llwyd o Fathafarn) (fl. c.1400–c.1490), Welsh poet
 Dafydd Nanmor (fl. 1450–1490), Welsh poet
 Dafydd ab Edmwnd (fl. c. 1450–1497), Welsh poet

Modern era
 Dafydd Trystan Davies (born 1974), Welsh academic and politician
 Dafydd Elis-Thomas (born 1946), Welsh politician
 Dafydd Hellard (born 1985), Welsh rugby league footballer and coach
 Dafydd Hewitt (born 1985), Welsh retired rugby union player
 Dafydd Howells (born 1995), Wales rugby union player
 Dafydd ab Hugh (born 1960), American science fiction author born David Friedman
 Dafydd Ieuan (born 1969), Welsh musician and producer
 Dafydd Ifans (born 1949), Welsh novelist and translator
 Dafydd James (born 1975), Wales retired rugby union player
 David Richards (Dafydd Ionawr) (1751-1827), Welsh poet
 Dafydd Iwan (born 1943), Welsh folk singer and politician
 Dafydd Jones (disambiguation)
 David Edward Lewis (1866–1941), Welsh businessman and philanthropist
 Dafydd Llywelyn (1939–2013), Welsh composer, pianist, conductor and teacher
 Dafydd Elystan Morgan, Baron Elystan-Morgan (1932–2021), Welsh politician
 Dafydd Rogers (born 1969), West End and Broadway theatre producer
 Dafydd Rowlands (1931–2001), Welsh Congregational minister, lecturer, writer and poet
 Dafydd Stephens (1942-2012), Welsh audiological physician and professor
 Dafydd Wigley (born 1943), Welsh politician
 Dafydd Williams (born 1954), Canadian physician and retired astronaut

Surname
 Catrin Dafydd, Welsh writer, winner of the Crown at the 2018 National Eisteddfod
 Einir Dafydd, Welsh singer who won the third series of the television talent show Wawffactor and the 2007 Cân i Gymru competition
 Fflur Dafydd (born 1978), Welsh novelist, singer-songwriter and musician
 Myrddin ap Dafydd (born 1956), Welsh editor and prifardd (Chief Bard)

See also
 Dewi (disambiguation)
 David (name)

Welsh masculine given names